Ninad Kamat is an Indian Bollywood actor. Some of his movies are Zabardast, Kabhi Up Kabhi Down, Shiva, Lage Raho Munnabhai, 7½ Phere, Viruddh, Dus, Parineeta, Zeher, Sangharsh, Doli Sajake Rakhna and Jai Gangaajal. He has also worked as a playback singer in Shiva and Darna Mana Hai. He is one of India's foremost voicing talents, having given his voice to thousands of commercials. He has dubbed for Amitabh Bachchan, Sachin Tendulkar, Will Smith, Jim Carrey and more.

Filmography

Films

Television

Playback singer

Dubbing roles

Animated series

Live action films

See also

List of Indian film actors
Dubbing (filmmaking)
List of Indian dubbing artists

References

External links
 
 

Indian male voice actors
Living people
Indian male film actors
Male actors in Hindi cinema
Bollywood playback singers
Indian male television actors
Indian male playback singers
1981 births